Antonino Mannino (7 December 1939 – 26 November 2022) was an Italian politician. A member of the Italian Communist Party, he served in the Chamber of Deputies from 1983 to 1992.

Mannino died in Partinico on 26 November 2022, at the age of 82.

References

1939 births
2022 deaths
Italian Communist Party politicians
Democratic Party of the Left politicians
20th-century Italian people
Deputies of Legislature IX of Italy
Deputies of Legislature X of Italy
Politicians from the Province of Palermo